Koompassia grandiflora is a species of plant in the family Fabaceae. It is found in West Papua (Indonesia) and Papua New Guinea. It is threatened by habitat loss.

References

Dialioideae
Flora of Papua New Guinea
Flora of Western New Guinea
Vulnerable plants
Taxonomy articles created by Polbot